Savelugu is a town and the capital of Savelugu Municipal, a municipality in the Northern Region of north Ghana. Savelugu has a 2012 settlement population of 38,074 people. There are many villages under Savelugu kingship. Most of the villages are smaller.

History
In the 19th-century Savelugu was the center of one of the major divisions of the Dagomba and ruled over by Andani who was involved in fighting with the raiding forces of the Zabarima (emirate).

Culture
Savelugu is one of the native towns of the Dagbon Kingdom and along with Karaga and Mion. It is one of the three traditional areas that are known as the gate skins to the sacred kingship of the Dagbon Kingdom- the others being Mion and Karaga, reserved only for the Princes of a Ya-Na.

Economy
The town is situated on an economically important route of Tamale-Bolgatanga highway and serves as the administrative and economic capital of the Savelugu Municipal District. Being an Agricultural hub itself and surrounded by towns and villages whose primary economic activity is Agriculture, it hosts the largest market in the district which serves as the main trade point for farmers in the district and other neighboring districts.

Education
The town of Savelugu is known as Yoo yili. Which has Senior High School with the name Savelugu Senior High School (SAVESS), a second cycle institution and the Savelugu School for the Deaf, one of the few schools for the deaf in Ghana. There are also scattered Day-care centers, primary schools and junior high schools within.

References 

Dagbon
Populated places in the Northern Region (Ghana)